Wisdom is the debut studio album of 16volt, released on May 25, 1993, by Re-Constriction Records. It was produced with the aide of Skinny Puppy composer and musician Dave Ogilvie.

Background
16volt sent a demo tape to college radio stations and caught the attention of future label owner and DJ Chase. From the band's demos, Chase petitioned Cargo Music to begin Re-Constriction Records and make Wisdom the label's third release. "Motorskills", which would become the first track on Wisdom, appeared on the compilation The Cyberflesh Conspiracy.

Reception

John Bush of AllMusic says "Skinny Puppy contributes a remix to Wisdom, which sounds much like the rest of the album." Aiding & Abetting said "16volt combine great beats with a vicious intensity that crawls under your skin and proceed to eat out your soul." Sonic Boom called Wisdom "nothing short than a spectacular display of craftsmanship and musical inspiration", saying "The genius of Eric Powell is evident even on this first release in his ability to seamlessly mix guitar and harsh electronics in a way that neither seems to drown the other out." Option compared the album favorably to Nine Inch Nails saying "[the band's] appeal lies in their blend of abrasive textures and relentless rhythms" while "the backbone of the songs is the rhythmic structure itself rather than cunningly concealed pop elements."

Track listing

Personnel
Adapted from the Wisdom liner notes.

16volt
 Joel Bornzin – drums, percussion, programming
 Jon Fell – guitar
 Eric Powell – lead vocals, sampler, synthesizer, programming, bass guitar, cover art, art direction, production, mixing & recording (8)
 Jeff Taylor – bass guitar, sampler, art direction

Addition performers
 A.P. Boone – sampler, programming
 Chris Carey – guitar

Production and design
 Animated Noise – cover art
 Keith "Fluffy" Auerbach – production, engineering, mixing (1, 3, 5, 7)
 SL Cohen – design, art direction
 Ryan Foster – mastering
 Tony Lash – editing, mastering, mixing & recording (1-4, 6–10)
 Dave Ogilvie – production, engineering, mixing (1, 2, 4, 6)

Release history

References

External links 
 
 Wisdom at Bandcamp
 

1993 debut albums
16volt albums
Albums produced by Dave Ogilvie
Metropolis Records albums
Off Beat (label) albums
Re-Constriction Records albums